Rumen Kasabov (born 15 November 1999) is a Bulgarian footballer who plays as a midfielder for Svetkavitsa Targovishte.

Career

Cherno More
On 31 May 2017, Kasabov made his professional début in a 2–2 away draw against Levski Sofia, coming on as substitute for Valentin Yoskov. He scored the second goal for his team in the match.

In June 2018, Kasabov was loaned to Second League club Chernomorets Balchik.

Career statistics

References

External links

1999 births
Living people
Bulgarian footballers
Association football midfielders
First Professional Football League (Bulgaria) players
Second Professional Football League (Bulgaria) players
PFC Cherno More Varna players
FC Chernomorets Balchik players
FC Pomorie players
PFC Svetkavitsa players
Sportspeople from Varna, Bulgaria